Jurga Ivanauskaitė (14 November 1961 – 17 February 2007) was a Lithuanian writer.

She was born in Vilnius, Lithuania.  While studying at the Vilnius Art Academy, she wrote her first book, The Year of the Lilies of the Valley, published in 1985. She subsequently published six novels, a children's book and a book of essays. Her works have been translated into several languages, including English, Latvian, Polish, Russian, German, and Swedish.

After her visits in the Far East, she became an active supporter of the Tibet liberation movement.

She died from soft tissue sarcoma in Vilnius at the age of 45 and is interred in the Antakalnis Cemetery.

Works translated to English 
Two Stories About Suicide (short story) in: Description of a Struggle: The Vintage Book of Contemporary Eastern European Writing translated from the Lithuanian by Laima Sruoginis
The Day that Never Happened (short story) in: Lithuania in Her Own Words : Anthology of Contemporary Lithuanian Wriring Tyto Alba, 1997, Vilnius.
Gone with the Dreams (excerpt from novel) in: The Earth Remains: An anthology of contemporary Lithuanian prose Tyto Alba, 2002, Vilnius.

External links
Biography at Books from Lithuania
 
 Jurga Ivanauskaitė at The Writers Club Retrieved on 2007-02-20

1961 births
2007 deaths
Burials at Antakalnis Cemetery
Lithuanian women novelists
Lithuanian novelists
Lithuanian women essayists
Writers from Vilnius
Recipients of the Lithuanian National Prize
Deaths from cancer in Lithuania
Lithuanian people of Russian descent
Tibet freedom activists
Vilnius Academy of Arts alumni
Lithuanian women short story writers
20th-century short story writers
21st-century short story writers
20th-century essayists
21st-century essayists
20th-century Lithuanian women writers
21st-century Lithuanian women writers